Douglas Bennett (October 24, 1945 – July 16, 2021) was an American politician who served in the Michigan House of Representatives from 2005 to 2010. In 2005, he was elected as a Democrat to the Michigan House of Representatives representing the 92nd district, which includes the cities of Muskegon, North Muskegon, and Muskegon Heights.

Career
Bennett served as Muskegon County Commissioner 1999–2004. In 2004, he was elected to the Michigan State House to replace Julie Dennis, who retired due to term limits. He represented the 92nd District, which is overwhelmingly Democratic. He was re-elected in 2006 with little opposition. He left office at the end of 2010 due to term limits. 

Bennett died in a motorcycle crash on July 16, 2021, in Muskegon, Michigan, at age 75.

References

External links
 Bennett's Official House Democrat's Website
 Official House Site
 Michigan Manual, 2005-2006, p. 171

1945 births
2021 deaths
County commissioners in Michigan
Democratic Party members of the Michigan House of Representatives
People from Muskegon, Michigan
20th-century American politicians
21st-century American politicians